The Agua Caliente Band of Cahuilla Indians of the Agua Caliente Indian Reservation is a federally recognized tribe of the Cahuilla, located in Riverside County, California, United States. They inhabited the Coachella Valley desert and surrounding mountains between 5000 BCE and 500 CE. With the establishment of the reservations, the Cahuilla were officially divided into 10 sovereign nations, including the Agua Caliente Band.

Reservation

The Agua Caliente Indian Reservation was founded on May 15, 1876 through Executive Order signed by President Ulysses S. Grant covering . In 1877 and 1907 the Reservation was extended, to cover  of land.

Since  of the reservation are in Palm Springs, California, the tribe is the city's largest collective landowner. The tribe owns Indian Canyons, located southwest of Palm Springs. The canyons are listed on the National Register of Historic Places. They also own land in the Santa Rosa and San Jacinto Mountains National Monument.

Government
The tribe's headquarters is located in Palm Springs, California. They ratified their constitution and bylaws in 1957, gaining federal recognition. For many years the band was headed by Chairman Richard M. Milanovich until his death on March 11, 2012. Their current tribal council is as follows:

 Chair: Reid D. Milanovich (elected  April 5, 2022)
 Vice Chair: Vincent Gonzales III (since  April 5, 2022)
 Secretary/Treasurer: Savana R. Saubel 
 Member: Jessica Norte
 Member: John R. Preckwinkle III

Language
Agua Caliente is one of three reservations where speakers of the "Pass" dialect of the Cahuilla were located, the other two being the Morongo Indian Reservation and Augustine Indian Reservation. Pass Cahuilla is a dialect of Cahuilla found within the Cupan branch of Takic languages, part of the Uto-Aztecan language family. Though revitalization efforts are underway, all dialects of Cahuilla are technically considered to be extinct as they are no longer spoken at home, and children are no longer learning them as a primary language. The last native speaker of Pass Cahuilla died in 2008.

Programs and economic development

Tribal programs and family services
Tribal Family Services was established in 2003 to support social and educational programs for tribal members. Other services include cultural preservation, child development, and scholarships.

The Jane Augustine Patencio Cemetery provides burial services. (Palm Springs artist Carl Eytel is one of the few non-Indians buried in the cemetery.)

Agua Caliente Cultural Museum

The Agua Caliente Cultural Museum in Palm Springs was founded by the tribe in 1991. It houses permanent collections and archives, a research library, and changing exhibits, as well as hosting an annual film festival.

Spa resort and casinos

The tribe owns three major casinos. The first two are the Spa Resort Casino (now Agua Caliente Palm Springs) in downtown Palm Springs, California at the original hot springs and the Agua Caliente Casino Resort Spa in Rancho Mirage, California. The resort at Rancho Mirage also includes a hotel, fitness center and spa, the Canyons Lounge, and seven different restaurants. The Spa Resort Casino, opened in 2003, features gaming, the Cascade Lounge, and four restaurants. The hotel in Downtown Palm Springs closed in 2014.

Ground was broken on the third Agua Caliente casino on November 4, 2019. It is located in Cathedral City, California and opened on November 25, 2020. The tribe annexed 13 acres of land to build the casino. The tribe is the only one in California to own more than one casino.

Indian Canyons
Tahquitz Canyon southwest of downtown Palm Springs is accessible for hiking and guided tours. The Indian Canyons (consisting of Palm Canyon, Murray Canyon, and Andreas Canyon) also accessible for hiking, horseback riding, and tours, are south of Palm Springs.

Golf courses
The tribe also maintains two golf courses in Indian Canyon which are open to the public.

Proposed downtown Palm Springs arena
In June 2019, it was announced that the tribe and entertainment company Oak View Group planned to build a privately funded arena on tribal land in downtown Palm Springs with the intent of the arena serving as the home ice for the expansion Seattle Kraken's American Hockey League affiliate. The arena was planned to begin construction in February 2020, but was suspended in the midst of the COVID-19 pandemic. By September 2020, OVG's negotiations with the tribe had come to a halt and the agreement was ended. The Oak View Group chose to build their arena elsewhere.

Notable tribal members
 Tribal leaders who have been honored with "Golden Palm Stars" on the Palm Springs Walk of Stars include:
 Richard Milanovich - Chair of the Agua Caliente Band 
 Reid D. Milanovich – Chair & Vice Chair of the Agua Caliente Band 
 Flora Agnes Patencio – Cahuilla Indian elder
 Ray Leonard Patencio – Cahuilla Indian leader
 Peter Siva – Cahuilla Tribal Chair
 Woodchuck Welmas (1891–1968) – professional NFL football player in the 1920s

See also
 Mission Indians
 Golden Checkerboard, a book about legal issues related to the checkerboard-patterned division of Palm Springs real estate, wherein the tribe retains ownership of alternating "squares" of the region, including Palm Springs and surrounding cities.

Bibliography
 
 Eargle Jr., Dolan H. California Indian Country: The Land and the People. San Francisco: Tree Company Press, 1992. .
 Pritzker, Barry M. A Native American Encyclopedia: History, Culture, and Peoples. Oxford: Oxford University Press, 2000. .

References

Further reading
 
 
 
 . .
 . .

External links
 Agua Caliente Band of Cahuilla Indians, official website
 Aqua Caliente Cultural Museum
 The Limu Project language and cultural revitalization
 
 
 

 
Federally recognized tribes in the United States
Native American tribes in California
Cahuilla
1876 establishments in California